Sportivo Atlético Club is an Argentine sports club, from the city of Las Parejas, in the Santa Fe Province. Although many sports are practised in the club, it is mostly known for its football and basketball teams. The football squad currently plays in the Torneo Argentino B, the regionalised 4th division of the Argentine football league system).

Titles
Liga Cañadense de Fútbol: 19
1949, 1950, 1954, 1955, 1957, 1966, 1982, 1992, 1995, Apertura 2003, Clausura 2003, Apertura 2005, Apertura 2006, Apertura 2011, Clausura 2011, Apertura 2013, Clausura 2013, Apertura 2014, Clausura 2014

Campeón Torneo Federal B
2015

See also
List of football clubs in Argentina
Argentine football league system

External links
Official website 

Football clubs in Santa Fe Province
Association football clubs established in 1922
Basketball teams in Argentina
1922 establishments in Argentina